Haider Hussain may refer to:

 Haider Hussain (singer-songwriter), Bangladeshi singer-songwriter
 Haider Hussain (field hockey) (born 1979), Pakistani field hockey player